Epimecis detexta, the avocado spanworm moth, is a species of geometrid moth in the family Geometridae. It is found in the Caribbean Sea and North America.

The MONA or Hodges number for Epimecis detexta is 6604.

References

Further reading

External links

 

Boarmiini
Articles created by Qbugbot
Moths described in 1860